Interstate 80 Business (I-80 Bus) is an Interstate business route in Humboldt County, Nevada. Serving the city of Winnemucca along Winnemucca Boulevard, I-80 Bus is also cosigned along portions of three other state highways through the city:
 US Route 95 (US 95) from Interstate 80 (I-80) exit 176 to Melarkey Street.
 State Route 289 (SR 289) from US 95 at Melarkey Street to East Second Street.
 SR 794 from SR 289 at East Second Street to I-80 exit 180.

Route description

I-80 Bus starts south of the incorporated city at exit 176 on I-80/US 95. The highway heads northeast concurrent with US 95 and parallel to US 80 and a railway through Winnemucca. Traveling further north, the route gets to an intersection with Melarkey Street, where US 95 leaves I-80 Bus and runs north under I-80. At this intersection, the business loop now runs concurrently with SR 289 until it branches off to the east, and SR 289 continues to the northeast under I-80. Over the final stretch from this intersection to its eastern terminus at exit 180 on I-80, I-80 Bus runs concurrently with SR 794, also named East Winnemucca Boulevard.

History
The I-80 Bus designation was first approved by the American Association of State Highway and Transportation Officials (AASHTO) at its spring meeting on June 28, 1982.

Major intersections

See also

 Business routes of Interstate 80

References

External links

80 Business (Winnemucca, Nevada)
Business (Winnemucca, Nevada)
80 Business (Winnemucca)
Transportation in Humboldt County, Nevada
Winnemucca, Nevada